2K Australia Pty Ltd (formerly Irrational Games Australia Pty. Ltd.) was an Australian video game developer based in Canberra. The company was founded as Irrational Games Australia, a subsidiary of Irrational Games, in April 2000. Irrational Games Australia and its parent were acquired by Take-Two Interactive in January 2006, with Irrational Games being placed under the 2K label. The two Irrational Games studio were split apart in August 2007, wherefore Irrational Games Australia became 2K Australia. Furthermore, 2K Australia under the name of sister studios 2K Marin between April 2010 and November 2011, and was finally shut down in April 2015.

History 
Irrational Games Australia was founded on 27 April 2000 as a subsidiary of Irrational Games. On 9 January 2006, Take-Two Interactive announced that they acquired Irrational Games, including Irrational Games Australia, and placed it under their 2K label. On 10 August 2007, shortly prior to the release of BioShock, the two Irrational Games studio were split apart, with Irrational Games becoming 2K Boston, and Irrational Games Australia turning into 2K Australia.

For the development of XCOM (later The Bureau: XCOM Declassified) in April 2010, 2K Australia started operating under the name of 2K Marin, another 2K studio. On 28 February 2011, 2K Australia's studio head, Martin Slater, abruptly left the company. On 20 October 2011, layoffs hit 2K Marin's Australian studio, with 15 jobs cut. Following the layoffs, on 28 November 2011, it was reported that the studio had dropped the 2K Marin label, and was working under their 2K Australia name again, this time on BioShock Infinite.

Chey, who had led the company as studio head, left 2K Australia by July 2011, when he founded his own video game studio, Blue Manchu. On 15 April 2015, 2K Australia was closed down and all staff were made redundant. At closure, 2K Australia was considered to have been the last AAA video game company in Australia.

Games developed

As Irrational Games Australia

As 2K Australia

References 

2K (company)
Australian companies disestablished in 2015
Australian companies established in 2000
Australian subsidiaries of foreign companies
Companies based in Canberra
Defunct video game companies of Australia
Irrational Games
Take-Two Interactive divisions and subsidiaries
Video game companies disestablished in 2015
Video game companies established in 2000
Video game development companies